The Esperanza Stone was a large (8-feet long) inscribed stone found in the valley of the Yaqui, Mexico. It was discovered and excavated in 1909 by Major F. R. Burnham and Charles Frederick Holder.

Discovery

The stone was discovered during an expedition in the Yaqui valley.

Description

The stone was "a brown, igneous rock, its longest axis about eight feet, and on the eastern face, which had an angle of about forty-five degrees, was the deep-cut inscription." Symbols on the stone include a volute and a swastika, also found on other stones in Mexico.

Legend

There was a legend that the stone had fallen down out of heaven in times past, and that the carving was by human hands.

Meaning of the symbols

Burnham believed that the symbols were Mayan. Others class them as Petroglyphs.

References 

Archaeological sites in Sonora
Rock art in North America
Mesoamerican stelae
Prehistoric inscriptions
Petroglyphs in Mexico
1909 archaeological discoveries